Kolm-e Pain (also Romanized as Kolm-e Pā‘īn and Kalam Pa’īn; also known as Kolm-e Soflá, Kūlm, Kūlm-e-Pā’īn, and Kūln) is a village in Dustan Rural District, Badreh District, Darreh Shahr County, Ilam Province, Iran. At the 2006 census, its population was 95, in 17 families. The village is populated by Kurds.

References 

Populated places in Darreh Shahr County
Kurdish settlements in Ilam Province